The Rickenbacker Electro A-22, nicknamed the "Frying Pan" is the first electric lap steel guitar. Developed in 1931/1932, it received its patent in August 1937.
A previous attempt, the Stromberg company‘s transducer-based "Stromberg Electro", was introduced in 1928. It used a "vibration-transfer rod" from the instrument's sounding board attached to magnets inside the guitar, and was not successful. George Beauchamp created the "Fry-Pan" in 1931, and it was subsequently manufactured by Rickenbacker Electro. The instrument gained its nickname because its circular body and long neck make it resemble a frying pan. 

It was designed to capitalize on the popularity of Hawaiian music in the 1930s. The instrument was made of cast aluminum, and featured a pickup that incorporated a pair of horseshoe magnets that arched over the strings. Beauchamp and machinist Adolph Rickenbacker began selling the guitar in 1932, but Beauchamp was not awarded a patent for his idea until 1937, which allowed other guitar companies to produce electric guitars in the same period.

Development 
In the 1930s, Hawaiian music enjoyed widespread popularity in the United States. However, Hawaiian music featured the guitar as the main melodic instrument, and the volume of acoustic guitars was insufficient for large audiences. Beauchamp, an enthusiast and player of Hawaiian music, mounted a magnetic pickup on his acoustic steel guitar to produce an electrical signal that was electronically amplified to drive a loudspeaker, producing a much louder sound. After discovering that his system produced copious amounts of unwanted feedback from sympathetic vibration of the guitar's body, Beauchamp reasoned that acoustic properties were actually undesirable in an electric instrument.

Beauchamp had helped develop the Dobro resonator guitar, and co-founded the National String Instrument Corporation. Through these businesses, he was acquainted with Rickenbacker, who owned the machine company that manufactured the aluminum resonators and brass bodies for the instruments. With Rickenbacker's help, Beauchamp designed a lap steel guitar with a solid aluminum body and neck. Rickenbacker produced the instruments from 1932 to 1939.

Gallery

References

External links 
National Public Radio: The Electric Guitar - Present at the Creation
Rickenbacker: The Earliest Days of the Electric Guitar

Electric guitars